"The Lawnmower Man" is a short story by Stephen King, first published in the May 1975 issue of Cavalier and later included in King's 1978 collection Night Shift.

Plot summary
Harold Parkette is in need of a new lawn mowing service. The summer before, a neighbor's cat was accidentally killed when another neighbor's dog chased it under the mower. Harold has been putting off hiring new help for the summer, but when he sees an ad for a mowing service, he calls. A van reading "Pastoral Greenery" soon pulls up to his home. The man working for the service, a hairy, pot-bellied fellow, is shown the overgrown back lawn and is hired. Harold is enjoying a rest as he reads the paper, wondering about the lawnmower man mentioning Circe, when he hears the lawnmower outside. Startled, he races to the back porch and sees the lawnmower running by itself and the naked lawnmower man following it on all fours and eating the grass. The lawnmower seemingly deliberately chases and kills a mole and Harold faints.

When Harold revives, the lawnmower man explains that this new method, introduced by his boss, grants substantial benefits, and that he makes sacrificial victims of customers who cannot appreciate the process. Harold, though unnerved, allows the lawnmower man to return to work. As soon as the man is out of sight, Harold desperately calls the police, but is interrupted by the lawnmower man, who reveals his boss's name: the ancient god Pan. The lawnmower briefly chases Harold through his living room before brutally slaughtering him.

When the police arrive, they conclude that Harold was murdered by a schizophrenic sex maniac. As they leave, the scent of freshly cut grass hangs strongly in the air.

Adaptations 
 The story was adapted in graphic form in Bizarre Adventures #29 (December 1981). The adaptation features the original text of the short story, accompanied by art by Walt Simonson. Publisher IDW rereleased the story in a portfolio edition shot from the original art in 2014.
 A twelve-minute Dollar Baby short film, The Lawnmower Man: A Suburban Nightmare, was released in 1987. It was written by future screenwriter and New Line Cinema production executive Michael De Luca (In the Mouth of Madness) and directed by James Gonis. The film was shot in 1985 while Gonis was a junior at New York University. Originally budgeted at $800, the final film ultimately cost nearly $5,000. It has screened at several film festivals: New York University; at Horrorfest 1989, a screening of King films at the Stanley Hotel (the hotel that inspired King's novel The Shining); a New York film festival of Greek-American filmmakers in 1991; and at the 1st Annual Dollar Baby festival in Orono, Maine in 2004.
 A feature film, The Lawnmower Man, starring Jeff Fahey and Pierce Brosnan, was released in 1992 by New Line Cinema. This film used an original screenplay entitled "CyberGod", borrowing only the title of the short story. The film concerns a scientist, Dr. Lawrence Angelo (Brosnan), who subjects mentally challenged Jobe Smith (Fahey) to virtual reality experiments. Jobe's mental abilities improve to superhuman levels as the process continues, but he lacks the emotional maturity and character to use his powers humanely. When Angelo's employers interfere with the process, Jobe becomes a homicidal megalomaniac. King won a lawsuit to have his name removed from the credits, and then won further damages when his name was included in the home video release. A video game adaptation, loosely based on the film, was released for the Super NES, Genesis, Sega CD, PC CD-ROM and Game Boy. A sequel film, Lawnmower Man 2: Beyond Cyberspace, was released in 1996.

See also
 Stephen King short fiction bibliography

References

External links
Stephen King Short Movies
The Lawnmower Man — a film by Jim Gonis

1975 short stories
Religion in science fiction
Horror short stories
Pan (god)
Science fiction short stories
Short stories adapted into films
Short stories by Stephen King
Works originally published in Cavalier (magazine)